Mount Heha is the highest mountain in Burundi and the highest point in the Burundi Highlands mountain range. It is located in the Bujumbura Rural province of Burundi and it lies approximately 20 km to the east of Lake Tanganyika and about 30 km to the southeast of Bujumbura, the largest city and former capital of Burundi.

References

External links
 Peakbagger listing

Heha
Highest points of countries